Mammon is a Norwegian detective television series that was broadcast on NRK1 in 2014 and 2016. The producers of the series are Vegard Stenberg Eriksen and his brother Gjermund.

It was directed by Cecilie Mosli.

Cast

Main
 Jon Øigarden as Peter Verås
 Nils Ole Oftebro as Frank Mathiesen
 Ingjerd Egeberg as Eva Verås
 Terje Strømdahl as Tore Verås
 Alexander Tunby Rosseland as Andreas Verås
 Anna Bache-Wiig sa Inger Marie Steffensen
 Dennis Storhøi as Tom Lied
 Andrea Bræin Hovig as Yvonne Haugen
 Halvard Holmen as Åge Haugen

Recurring
 Trond Espen Seim as Prime Minister Michael Woll
 Ingar Helge Gimle as Minister of Finance, Erik Ulrichsen
 Bjarte Hjelmeland as Minister of Education, Christian Schjelderup
 Laura Christensen as Ellen Claussen
 Pål Christian Eggen as Thorgrim Hammern
 Anders Danielsen Lie as Johannes "Johs" Ritter Hansen
 Laila Goody as Gunn Høgh
 Jan Gunnar Røise as Aslak Heimdahl
 Ine Jansen as Stine Gisken
 Michael McElhatton as Melanie Holly
 Erland Bakker as Lars Fritzmann
 Iben Akerlie as Amelia Woll

Series overview

Episodes

Season 1 (2014)

Season 2 (2016)

Awards and nominations

References

Other
 «Mammon» sesong 3: - NRK styrer sjappa
 Fortsatt forvirret? Her er de ubesvarte Mammon-spørsmålene

External links
 

2010s Norwegian television series
2014 Norwegian television series debuts
Detective television series